Le syndrôme de Peter Pan is the third studio album by French singer and television celebrity Elisa Tovati. It was released on 12 August 2011 in France as a digital download and on CD. It peaked at number 45 on the French Albums Chart.

Singles
"Il nous faut" was released as the first single from the album on 11 May 2011. It peaked at number 6 on the French Singles Chart.

Track listing

Chart performance

Release history

References

2011 albums
Elisa Tovati albums